Luizianne de Oliveira Lins (born November 18, 1968) is a Brazilian journalist. politician and former mayor of Fortaleza. She was Fortaleza's second female mayor.

Luizianne Lins has been affiliated with the Workers' Party since 1989. She is a socialist and a feminist.

Luizianne holds a degree in journalism from the Federal University of Ceará. After graduation, she became a photography professor at the same University - currently on authorized leave to serve at Congress.

In 1996, she was elected to Fortaleza's city council, and reelected in 2000. While on the City council, she led the Education, Culture, and Sports Commission and also presided over the Women, Youth and Children Commission - which was created by a Law the councilwoman proposed.

In 2002, she was elected to the State Congress. She stepped down on late 2003, as she was elected mayor of Fortaleza.

In 2004, she ran for the position of mayor of Fortaleza - Ceará. During the election's first round, the national leadership of the Workers' Party (PT) supported the PCdoB candidate, Ignacio Arruda, due to PT's national strategy and alliances. Nevertheless, she managed to make it to the second round of elections. Once on the second round of the election, she received support from the Worker's Party, and a number of other historically leftist parties, including PSB. She then defeated Moroni Torgan from Liberal Front Party, being elected mayor of Fortaleza.

Luizianne was re-elected mayor in 2008, completing her second term as mayor of Fortaleza on December 2012. Brazil's law does not allow politicians in executive position to serve more than two consecutive terms.

Luizianne Lins was elected to the National Congress in 2014 with 130.717 votes (2,99% of the total votes).

See also
 List of feminists
 Women's suffrage
 Feminism
 List of mayors of Fortaleza

External links
 International Viewpoint article (English)
 3=Página oficial da candidata - Luizianne Lins (Portuguese)
 3=Partido dos Trabalhadores - Luizianne Lins (Portuguese)

Brazilian feminists
Mayors of Fortaleza
1968 births
Living people
Women mayors of places in Brazil
Workers' Party (Brazil) politicians